Albert Einstein conducted several unsuccessful investigations. These pertain to force, superconductivity, and other research.

Special relativity
This differs from the accepted expression today, because, as noted in the footnotes to Einstein's paper added in the 1913 reprint, "it is more to the point to define force in such a way that the laws of energy and momentum assume the simplest form", as was done, for example, by Max Planck in 1906, who gave the now familiar expression  for the transverse mass. 

As Miller points out, this is equivalent to the transverse mass predictions of both Einstein and Lorentz. Einstein had commented already in the 1905 paper that "With a different definition of force and acceleration, we should naturally obtain other expressions for the masses. This shows that in comparing different theories... we must proceed very cautiously."

Superconductivity
Einstein published (in 1922) a qualitative theory of superconductivity based on the vague idea of electrons shared in orbits. This paper predated modern quantum mechanics, and today is regarded as being incorrect. The current theory of low temperature superconductivity was only worked out in 1957, thirty years after the establishing of modern quantum mechanics. However, even today, superconductivity is not well understood, and alternative theories continue to be put forward, especially to account for high-temperature superconductors.

Black holes
Einstein denied several times that black holes could form. In 1939 he published a paper that argues that a star collapsing would spin faster and faster, spinning at the speed of light with infinite energy well before the point where it is about to collapse into a Schwarzchild singularity, or black hole.

Einstein's argument itself only shows that stable spinning objects have to spin faster and faster to stay stable before the point where they collapse. But it is well understood today (and was understood well by some even then) that collapse cannot happen through stationary states the way Einstein imagined. Nevertheless, the extent to which the models of black holes in classical general relativity correspond to physical reality remains unclear, and in particular the implications of the central singularity implicit in these models are still not understood.

Closely related to his rejection of black holes, Einstein believed that the exclusion of singularities might restrict the class of solutions of the field equations so as to force solutions compatible with quantum mechanics, but no such theory has ever been found.

Quantum mechanics
In the early days of quantum mechanics, Einstein tried to show that the uncertainty principle was not valid. By 1927 he had become convinced of its utility, but he always opposed it.

EPR paradox
In the EPR paper, Einstein argued that quantum mechanics cannot be a complete realistic and local representation of phenomena, given specific definitions of "realism", "locality", and "completeness". The modern consensus is that Einstein's concept of realism is too restrictive.

Cosmological term
Einstein himself considered the introduction of the cosmological term in his 1917 paper founding cosmology as a "blunder". The theory of general relativity predicted an expanding or contracting universe, but Einstein wanted a universe which is an unchanging three-dimensional sphere, like the surface of a three-dimensional ball in four dimensions. 

He wanted this for philosophical reasons, so as to incorporate Mach's principle in a reasonable way. He stabilised his solution by introducing a cosmological constant, and when the universe was shown to be expanding, he retracted the constant as a blunder. This is not really much of a blunder – the cosmological constant is necessary within general relativity as it is currently understood, and it is widely believed to have a nonzero value today.

Minkowski's work

Einstein did not immediately appreciate the value of Minkowski's four-dimensional formulation of special relativity, although within a few years he had adopted it within his theory of gravitation.

Heisenberg's work
Finding it too formal, Einstein believed that Heisenberg's matrix mechanics was incorrect. He changed his mind when Schrödinger and others demonstrated that the formulation in terms of the Schrödinger equation, based on wave–particle duality was equivalent to Heisenberg's matrices.

Unified field theory
Einstein spent many years pursuing a unified field theory, and published many papers on the subject, without success.

References

Albert Einstein
History of astronomy